Charité Mumbongo (born 14 March 2002) is a Swedish handballer for Fleury Loiret HB and the Swedish national team.

She made her debut on the Swedish national team on 24 April 2022, against Turkey.

On 27 April 2022, it was announced that Mumbongo had signed a 2-year contract with Viborg HK.

She represented Sweden at the 2019 European Women's U-17 Handball Championship in Slovenia, placing as runner-up. She also participated in the 2021 Women's U-19 European Handball Championship.

Achievements 
Youth European Championship:
Silver Medalist: 2019

References

2002 births
Living people
Handball players from Gothenburg
Swedish female handball players
IK Sävehof players
21st-century Swedish women